The 1953 Duke Blue Devils football team represented the Duke Blue Devils of Duke University during the 1953 college football season.

Duke won a share of the 1953 ACC Championship, and finished the season ranked 18th in the final AP poll.

Schedule

References

Duke
Duke Blue Devils football seasons
Atlantic Coast Conference football champion seasons
Duke Blue Devils football